Rhagioninae is a worldwide subfamily of predatory snipe flies.

Genera
Arthroteles Bezzi, 1926 - Afrotropic
Atherimorpha White, 1914 - Australasia, Neotropic, Afrotropic
Desmomyia Brunetti, 1912 -  Palearctic, Oriental
Rhagio Fabricius, 1775 - Nearctic, Palearctic
Sierramyia Kerr, 2010  - Nearctic/Neotropic

References

 Biolib

Rhagionidae
Brachycera subfamilies
Taxa named by Pierre André Latreille